Jeff Beck with the Jan Hammer Group Live is a live album by Jeff Beck, released in 1977 on Epic Records.

Recording
No precise dates and locations are given for the live recordings. The tour began in June 1976 and ended in February 1977, with 117 shows performed.

A&R man Tom Werman suggested that the date at the Astor Theater in Reading, PA (31 August 1976) yielded the best performances, and was going to provide the bulk of the album at the time of his involvement in the project. Beck mixed this along with other recordings at Allen Toussaint's studio in New Orleans.

Then Jan Hammer decided to mix the album himself, and did so with Dennis Weinreich at Scorpio Sound Studios in London, England.

The stereo spectrum of this album duplicates the stage set-up with guitar positioned center right, keyboards center left, violin right and drums and bass center.

Track listing

Charts

Personnel
 Jeff Beck - guitar, bass guitar, special effects
The Jan Hammer Group
 Jan Hammer - Moog, Oberheim and Freeman string symphonizer synthesizers, electric piano, timbales; lead vocal on "Earth (Still Our Only Home)"
 Tony "Thunder" Smith - drums; lead vocal on "Full Moon Boogie"
 Fernando Saunders - bass, harmony vocals; rhythm guitar on "She's A Woman"
 Steve Kindler - violin; string synthesizer on "Darkness"; rhythm guitar on "Blue Wind"

References

Jeff Beck albums
Jan Hammer albums
1977 live albums
Epic Records live albums